Club Atlético Güemes, known as Atlético Güemes or simply Güemes, is an Argentine sports club based in Santiago del Estero, founded on 12 October 1932.

The club is mostly known for its football team, which currently plays in Primera Nacional, the second division of the Argentine league system. Other sports practised at the club are basketball, roller skating, five-a-side football, judo and cestoball.

History
Founded on 12 October 1932 as an honour to military leader Martín Miguel de Güemes, the club mainly played in regional competitions. In 1986, after winning the previous year's Torneo Regional, they featured in the 1986 Liguilla Pre-Libertadores, being knocked out by Ferro Carril Oeste in the qualifying rounds.

Güemes narrowly achieved promotion to Primera B Nacional in 1988; after leading their zone in the Torneo del Interior, the club reached the finals but lost to San Martín de Tucumán. The club finally reached promotion to the Torneo Federal B in 2014, after winning eight out of ten matches in the regional leagues.

On 28 December 2015, Güemes defeated San Martín de Formosa and reached the Torneo Federal A for the first time in their history. Despite suffering immediate relegation, the club returned to the division for the 2019–20 campaign, where they led their group before the season was curtailed due to the COVID-19 pandemic.

Güemes won the 2020 Torneo Federal A after the season was reestablished, achieving promotion to the Primera Nacional on 18 January 2021.

References

External links
 
 

Football clubs in Santiago del Estero Province
Association football clubs established in 1932
1932 establishments in Argentina